is a former Japanese football player. He played for Japan national team.

Club career
Tomizawa was born in Fujieda on December 3, 1943. After graduating from high school, he joined Yawata Steel (later Nippon Steel). In 1965, Yawata Steel joined new league Japan Soccer League. He retired in 1976, having played 164 games and scored 22 goals in the league.

National team career
In October 1964, Tomizawa was selected Japan national team for 1964 Summer Olympics in Tokyo. However, he did not compete. On March 14, 1965, he debuted for Japan national team against Hong Kong. In 1968, he was selected Japan for 1968 Summer Olympics in Mexico City. He played against Hungary in semifinal and Japan won Bronze Medal. In 2018, this team was selected Japan Football Hall of Fame. He also played at 1970 Asian Games. At 1972 Summer Olympics qualification in 1971, Japan's failure to qualify for 1972 Summer Olympics. This qualification was his last game for Japan. He played 9 games and scored 2 goals for Japan until 1965.

National team statistics

References

External links
 
 
 Japan National Football Team Database
Japan Football Hall of Fame (Japan team at 1968 Olympics) at Japan Football Association
 

1943 births
Living people
Association football people from Shizuoka Prefecture
Japanese footballers
Japan international footballers
Japan Soccer League players
Nippon Steel Yawata SC players
Olympic footballers of Japan
Olympic medalists in football
Olympic bronze medalists for Japan
Medalists at the 1968 Summer Olympics
Footballers at the 1964 Summer Olympics
Footballers at the 1968 Summer Olympics
Footballers at the 1970 Asian Games
Association football defenders
Asian Games competitors for Japan
People from Fujieda, Shizuoka